Volk is a German term for a people or an ethnic group.

Volk, Völk or Volks may also refer to:

People
 Volk (surname), people with the name

Places
 6189 Völk, a main belt asteroid
 Volk Field Air National Guard Base, Wisconsin, USA
 Volk's Electric Railway, a heritage railway in Brighton, UK

Business and Entertainment
 "Volk", a song on the 2018 Suspiria album
 Volk (album), a 2006 album by Laibach
 Volk Racing, a flagship brand of forged alloy wheel by Rays Engineering
 Volks, a Japanese doll-making company
 Volks, an informal term for a Volkswagen car
 Volk/Wolf, the protagonist of the Soviet animated series Nu Pogodi

See also